Fidesz–KDNP Party Alliance, formerly also known as the Alliance of Hungarian Solidarity, is a right-wing national conservative political alliance of two political parties in Hungary, the Fidesz – Hungarian Civic Alliance (Fidesz) and the Christian Democratic People's Party (KDNP). The two parties jointly contested every national election since the 2006 parliamentary election. The Fidesz–KDNP party alliance has governed Hungary since 2010, altogether obtaining a supermajority in each of the 2010, 2014, 2018, and 2022 national elections.

History 

The two parties formed their permanent electoral coalition on 10 December 2005. After the 2006 election, Fidesz and KDNP separately formed parliamentary groups, but they established a caucus alliance in the Hungarian parliament.

Technically Fidesz and KDNP are a coalition, but many consider KDNP to actually be a satellite party of Fidesz, since it has been unable to get into the Parliament on its own since 1994 when it barely passed the election threshold of 5% of votes. Without Fidesz, its support cannot be measured, and even a leading Fidesz politician, János Lázár stated in 2011 that Fidesz does not consider the government to be a coalition government.

On March 3, 2021, the Fidesz left the European People's Party Parliamentary Group, while KDNP is still a member of it.

Electoral results

National Assembly

European Parliament

Notes

See also
CDU/CSU

References

Sources

2005 establishments in Hungary
Anti-communism in Hungary
Anti-communist parties
Anti-immigration politics in Europe
Catholic political parties
Conservative parties in Hungary
Eurosceptic parties in Hungary
Member parties of the European People's Party
Parties represented in the European Parliament
Political parties established in 2005
Political party alliances in Hungary
Right-wing populism in Hungary
Right-wing populist parties
Social conservative parties
Right-wing parties in Europe
Christian democratic parties in Hungary